The 12th Pan American Games were held in Mar del Plata, Argentina from March 11 to March 25, 1995.

Medals

Gold

Men's Running Target (10m): Attila Solti

Silver

Men's Welterweight (– 76 kg): Mario Bonilla

Bronze

Men's 20 km Road Walk: Julio René Martínez
Men's 50 km Road Walk: Julio César Urías

Men's Welterweight (– 67 kg): Tomás Leyva

Results by event

See also
 Guatemala at the 1996 Summer Olympics

Nations at the 1995 Pan American Games
P
1995